Oranges and Lemons is a 1923 American one-reel silent comedy starring Stan Laurel. He plays an incompetent employee of a fruit orchard who only manages to keep his job because his fellow workers are even more inept, including the lovely packer (Grant) who flirts with him. As is typical of his films in this era, his character is far more aggressive and physical than the more familiar meek personality he adopted when he later teamed with Oliver Hardy.

The name "Sunkist" was taken from the long-established citrus fruit company Sunkist Growers, Incorporated.

Plot
Sunkist (Stan) wearing an under-sized sombrero is operating a pointless machine, where his boss drops fruit into a hopper at one end, and the fruit is scooped up and dropped into a tin bath held by another employee. None of the fruit is going in so they swap roles and Stan gets the fruit dropping on his head.

Stan goes off to collect on his own then a fat worker asks for help. A step ladder with a rubber central sections adds to the hilarity.

The boss chases Sunkist around and action moves inside the packing plant.

Cast
 Stan Laurel as Sunkist
 Katherine Grant as Little Valencia
 Eddie Baker as Orange Blossom, the boss
 George Rowe as Worker
 Sammy Brooks as Worker
 Mark Jones as Worker
 'Tonnage' Martin Wolfkeil as Worker
 James Finlayson as Worker

See also
 List of American films of 1923
 Stan Laurel filmography

References

External links

1923 films
1923 comedy films
1923 short films
American silent short films
American black-and-white films
Silent American comedy films
American comedy short films
Films directed by George Jeske
1920s American films